Robert Allen Baird (January 16, 1940 – April 11, 1974) was an American professional baseball player, a left-handed pitcher who appeared in eight total games in Major League Baseball over parts of two seasons with the Washington Senators (1962–1963). He attended Carson Newman College.

Baird had a six-year (1962–1967) professional career. The Senators, then a two-year-old expansion team, brought Baird up for an audition during the September of his first year in pro ball, 1962, and gave him three starts. Then, the following September, they called him up again and used him in five games, three as a starter. But Baird went winless in four decisions. In 22 MLB innings pitched, he allowed 25 hits, 15 bases on balls, and 18 earned runs. He fanned ten. Baird appeared in 148 games in minor league baseball, where he fashioned a 47–46 record and a 3.99 earned run average.

After baseball, Baird was a traveling salesman for a Cincinnati-based company. Baird died in Chattanooga, Tennessee, at age 34, nine days after he was shot by a woman who was charged with his murder. He is interred in Lynnhurst Cemetery in Knoxville.

References

External links

1940 births
1974 deaths
People murdered in Tennessee
Albuquerque Dodgers players
Baseball players from Knoxville, Tennessee
Carson–Newman Eagles baseball players
Deaths by firearm in Tennessee
Major League Baseball pitchers
Pensacola Senators players
Raleigh Capitals players
Spokane Indians players
Tri-City Atoms players
Washington Senators (1961–1971) players
York White Roses players